The Humboldt 30, also called the Humboldt Bay 30, is an American sailboat, that was designed by Gary Mull  and Jim P. Donovan. The design is out of production.

Production
The boat was built by Humboldt Bay Yachts in the United States. Only six were constructed between the start of production in 1982 and 1984, when production ended.

Design
The Humboldt 30 is a small racing keelboat, built predominantly of fiberglass, with a Klegecell closed cell, PVC foam core. It has a fractional sloop rig, a transom-hung rudder and a fixed fin keel. It displaces  and carries  of ballast.

The boat has a PHRF racing average handicap of 102 with a high of 98 and low of 106.

See also
List of sailing boat types

References

External links
Photo of a Humboldt 30

Keelboats
1980s sailboat type designs
Sailing yachts
Sailboat types built by Humboldt Bay Yachts
Sailboat type designs by Gary Mull
Sailboat type designs by Jim P. Donovan